Aromanian studies are an academic discipline centered on the study of the Aromanians. They are included within Balkan and Romance studies. Notable scholars on Aromanian topics include , Thede Kahl and Gustav Weigand. The Aromanian question, a term used for the historical and current division on ethnic identity among the Aromanians, has prominently influenced Aromanian studies.

Description
Aromanian studies are a subset of Balkan studies. The beginning of the 21st century has seen an increase of interest in Balkanology on the small autochthonous minorities of the Balkans, including the Aromanians. The Aromanians are also researched on Romance studies.

Nationalisms and the Aromanian question have proven to be difficult obstacles for the progress of Aromanian studies, as issues such as whether the Aromanians are an independent separate ethnic group or if they are a subgroup to the Greeks or the Romanians remain controversial.

Institutions and journals
In 1995, with help from the University of Freiburg, the Aromanian professor  founded the European Center of Aromanian Studies at Freiburg im Breisgau, Germany. The Aromanian journal Zborlu a nostru ("Our Word") is edited by the European Center of Aromanian Studies.

Rivista di litiraturã shi studii armãni ("Journal of Aromanian Literature and Studies") is an academic journal on the Aromanians founded on 1 April 1994, by the Aromanian writer . It was published semiannually by the Editura Cartea Aromână ("Aromanian Book Publishing House", in the United States) and the Fundația Cartea Aromână ("Aromanian Book Foundation", in Romania) until April 2007, having a total of 33 volumes. It was exclusively written in Aromanian, in a special alphabet aimed at becoming the standard script for the Aromanian language. The journal promoted Aromanian works, specially unpublished ones; covered Aromanian literature, be it classical or recent; included cultural and philological studies on the Aromanians; and contained ethnographical and historical information about the ethnic group.

Notable people
In 2013, the Czech ethnologist and professor  referred to Gustav Weigand, a German linguist, as the "founding father of Aromanian studies". Other researchers that have provided works relevant to Aromanian studies include the Aromanian linguist , the German ethnographer and ethnolinguist Thede Kahl, the Aromanian historian and philologist  and the Romanian researcher Emil Țîrcomnicu.

See also
 Romanian studies

References

 
Balkan studies
Romance studies